Meena Upadhyaya OBE is an Indian-born Welsh medical geneticist and an honorary distinguished professor at Cardiff University. Her research has focused on the genes that cause various genetic disorders, in particular neurofibromatosis type I and facioscapulohumeral muscular dystrophy.

Biography
Upadhyaya was born in India. She entered an arranged marriage and joined her husband, an engineer, to the United Kingdom. Having studied an honours bachelor's degree in biology at the University of Delhi, she completed a Master of Science at the University of Edinburgh followed by a doctorate at Cardiff University. 

Upadhyaya completed a fellowship with the Royal College of Pathologists in 2000, becoming one of the first people to do so in the field of medical genetics. Her research career focused on genetic disorders, especially neurofibromatosis type I and facioscapulohumeral muscular dystrophy. She was involved in identifying the genetic mutations responsible for these two diseases and to evaluate whether certain mutation was associated with specific clinical features. She developed molecular tests to aid in the diagnosis of more than 20 genetic diseases including neurofibromatosis type 1. She has also researched the reasons that in some people with neurofibromatosis type I, the benign tumours can become malignant. Using high-throughput techniques, she was able to identify  molecular targets which will be important for the treatment of the patients. Over her career, she authored more than 200 scientific articles and four textbooks and received awards from the Muscular Dystrophy Association (2009), the Inspire Wales Awards (2010), Theodor Schwann award from the European Neurofibromatosis Group (2013), and the recognition award from Welsh Assembly (2011). She was a professor in Cardiff University's Institute of Cancer Genetics and directed the All Wales Medical Genetics Service Research and Development Laboratory until her retirement in 2014, thereafter serving as an honorary distinguished professor at Cardiff. She received an OBE in 2016 for "services to medical genetics and the Welsh Asian community". She received St David Award in 2017 in Innovation, Science and Technology category for her outstanding contribution to medical genetics. She also received the Welsh Muslim Council award (2019) for her contributions to academia and Legacy Maker Community Achievement Award (2019) from Race Council Cymru. Upadhyaya became UK's first female British-Indian professor to receive Honorary Fellowship at University of Wales Trinity Saint David in 2017. She is listed as one of the 100 Wales's brilliant women by WalesOnline.  She also made to the list of 100 Welsh Women, created by Women's Equality Network, to mark the centenary of the Representation of the People Act 1918. She was awarded the prestigious fellowship of Learned Society of Wales in 2018. She has been an International Advisor for the Organisation of the Rare Diseases, India (2016) and also sits on the Advisory Board of Genoma India international forum, Philadelphia, USA and on the Medical Advisory Board as well as a trustee of Nerve Tumours, UK. Upadhyaya is a co-director of the project entitled: 70 years of struggle and achievement: Life Stories of Ethnic Minority Women in Wales 2019 (funded by the Heritage Lottery Fund). 

She organised First International Conference on RASopathies and Neurofibromatoses in Asia: Identification and Advances of New Therapeutics in Kochi, Kerala, India in 2017. 

She was elected to be a Council Member of the RCPath in 2014 and the Learning Society of Wales in 2020. Upadhyaya also served as a mentor on Dame Rosemary Butler's Women in Public Life Scheme (2014-2015). She is a trustee for Race Equality First, Race Council Cymru, the European NF Association and sits on the Advisory Committee of Cardiff University's BME+ Staff Network, NWAMI, Purple Plaques, and Monumental Welsh Women. Upadhyaya has been appointed as a Non-Executive Director (NED) on the Welsh Government Civil Service Board (2020). She was appointed as an Honorary Professor of Amrita School of Medical Sciences, Kochi, Kerala, India (2020) and an Honorary Executive Director of Chhaya Public School, India. 

Upadhyaya is also an advocate for women of ethnic minorities; she is the founder and Chair of Welsh Asian Women Achievement Awards, now Ethnic Minority Welsh Women Achievement Association (EMWWAA) and the organisation Ethnic Minority Women in Welsh Healthcare (EMWWH). She sits on many committees focusing on equality, diversity and academia.

References

Indian geneticists
Welsh geneticists
Women geneticists
Academics of Cardiff University
Alumni of Cardiff University
Delhi University alumni
Alumni of the University of Edinburgh
Indian emigrants to the United Kingdom
Officers of the Order of the British Empire
Indian emigrants to Wales
Fellows of the Royal College of Pathologists
Year of birth missing (living people)
Living people
20th-century Indian women scientists
Indian women biologists
20th-century Indian biologists
Naturalised citizens of the United Kingdom